Jay Thomas (born October 18, 1960) is a former American college football coach, previously serving as the head football coach at Northwestern State University, a position he held from December 2012 until November 2017. He held the same capacity at Nicholls State University from 2004 to 2009. Thomas compiled an overall record of 48–71.

Coaching career
Thomas began his coaching career as a high school coach and subsequently served as an assistant coach at Louisiana State, Nicholls State and Southeast Missouri. He returned to Nicholls State as the defensive coordinator in 1999 and was elevated to the head coach position in 2004. Following his firing in 2009, Thomas spent two seasons as assistant head coach and defensive line coach at Northwestern State before becoming the defensive coordinator at Missouri Southern in 2012.

On December 20, 2012, Thomas was hired as the head coach at Northwestern State. He was let go by Northwestern State after the 2017 football.

Personal life
Thomas is an alumnus of the University of Southern Mississippi.

Head coaching record

References

External links
 Northwestern State profile

1960 births
Living people
LSU Tigers football coaches
Missouri Southern Lions football coaches
Nicholls Colonels football coaches
Northwestern State Demons football coaches
Southeast Missouri State Redhawks football coaches
University of Southern Mississippi alumni
People from Baker, Louisiana
Sportspeople from East Baton Rouge Parish, Louisiana